Sarah Stewart may refer to:

Sarah Stewart (author) (born 1939), American children's author
Sarah Stewart (basketball) (born 1976), Australian wheelchair basketball player
Sarah Stewart (cancer researcher) (1905–1976), US-Mexican viral oncologist
Sarah Hicks Stewart (born 1963), Alabama judge
Cissie Stewart (1911–2008), Olympic Games medalist in 1928, whose legal name was Sarah Stewart
Sarah Stewart, character in Raising Dad

See also
Sara Stewart (born 1966), Scottish actress
Sarah T. Stewart-Mukhopadhyay, planetary geoscientist